Helga Cecilia von der Esch, (born 12 June 1985) is a Swedish actress and comedian. Von der Esch was born 12 June 1985 in Falun, Sweden and her maiden name is Forss. Her breakthrough role was the role of Jennifer in the 2010 film Simple Simon and Cindy in the ICA commercials. When she was seven, von der Esch participated in a segment of Trafikmagasinet on SVT. Her film debut was in Maria Blom's 2004 film Masjävlar. Von der Esch joined Nour El-Refai in the hidden camera show Raj Raj broadcast on TV400. She also worked with El-Refai, Johan Matton, Björn Gustafsson, and Peter Settman in the TV3 comedy show Hus i helvete. With El-Refai and Maud Lindström, she has written and performed the act "Almost Like Boys" at Riksteatern in 2008, a comedy act about gender. Von der Esch has also appeared in Henrik Schyffert's comedy series Sverige pussas och kramas on Kanal5. In summer 2009, she also participated in Kanal5 series Balls of Steel.

In 2008, she participated in the TV game show Brain Wall, teaming up with El-Refai and Grete Havnesköld. In 2009 Forss participated in the Sveriges Radio comedy show Kungen kommer till Rissne. With Martin Soneby, she presented the show Silent Library on Kanal5. In 2008 she became known for her role as Cindy in the ICA commercials. In 2010 she starred as Jennifer in the film Simple Simon with Bill Skarsgård, earning her a Guldbagge nomination for supporting actress in a feature film. In August 2011 she was a "Sommarpratare" in Sommar i P1 on Sveriges Radio.

Von der Esch was a sidekick to Pär Lernström in Idol 2011 on TV4. Since 2012 she has been a goodwill ambassador for the Child Cancer Foundation.

In 2013, she participated in the play De 39 Stegen at Intiman in Stockholm.

She competes as a celebrity dancer in Let's Dance 2022, which is broadcast by TV4.

References

External links

Swedish film actresses
Living people
1985 births
People from Falun
21st-century Swedish actresses